Baddomalhi railway station is located in Baddomalhi city, Narowal district, Punjab province, Pakistan.

See also
 List of railway stations in Pakistan
 Pakistan Railways

References

Railway stations in Narowal district
Railway stations on Shahdara Bagh–Chak Amru Branch Line